José Gómez Cervantes (19 March 1956 – July 2021) was a long-distance runner from Mexico, who represented his native country at two consecutive Summer Olympics, starting in 1980.

He died in July 2021.

Achievements

References

External links

 Full Olympians
 1983 Year Ranking
 

1956 births
2021 deaths
Mexican male long-distance runners
Athletes (track and field) at the 1980 Summer Olympics
Athletes (track and field) at the 1984 Summer Olympics
Olympic athletes of Mexico
Athletes (track and field) at the 1983 Pan American Games
Pan American Games medalists in athletics (track and field)
Pan American Games gold medalists for Mexico
Universiade medalists in athletics (track and field)
Competitors at the 1978 Central American and Caribbean Games
Central American and Caribbean Games bronze medalists for Mexico
Universiade silver medalists for Mexico
Central American and Caribbean Games medalists in athletics
Medalists at the 1979 Summer Universiade
Medalists at the 1983 Pan American Games
20th-century Mexican people